Stirton with Thorlby is a civil parish in the Craven district of North Yorkshire, England. The parish includes the settlements of Stirton and Thorlby. The population at the 2011 census was 204, an increase on the 2001 census figure of 173.

History 
Stirton with Thorlby was formerly a township in the parish of Skipton, in 1866 Stirton with Thorlby became a civil parish in its own right. On 1 April 1938 7 acres was transferred to Skipton.

References

Civil parishes in North Yorkshire
Craven District